Bon Gaultier was a pen name assumed by the writers William Edmondstoune Aytoun and Sir Theodore Martin.

The humorous Bon Gaultier Ballads remained popular for a long time; originally contributed to a magazine, they appeared in book form in 1845.

Contents

The Broken Pitcher- a story about a Moorish woman who throws a Christian Knight down a well after stealing three kisses from her

External links 
The Cambridge History... Bon Gaultier Ballads

Collective pseudonyms
19th-century pseudonymous writers
Scottish humorists
19th century in Scotland
Scottish literature